Michelle Mah is the director of operations for The Slanted Door Group in San Francisco, California. She was previously the chef de cuisine at The Slanted Door, consulting chef at The Brixton, and executive chef at Midi.

Early life
Michelle Mah was born in 1975 Seoul, Korea and moved with her family to San Dimas, California at the age of three. Her mother, grandmother, and father all cooked at home. In 1997, she earned her B.A. in Ethnic Studies and a minor in General Literature from University of California, San Diego.

Career
Mah's culinary experience began at Café Japengo in San Diego under chef Amiko Gubbins, who inspired her to enroll in the nearby College of Food, where she graduated with an associate degree in Occupational Studies. She continued her education at California Culinary Academy (CCA) in San Francisco. She stayed in San Francisco and worked at Moose's as a pantry cook and later completed her externship for CCA at Turtle Bay resort in Saint John, U.S. Virgin Islands. When she returned, she worked as a sous chef at  Paul Arenstam's Belon and later at the Grand Café, where Arenstam was executive chef. When she was offered a position as executive chef at Kimpton's Ponzu, an upscale Asian restaurant, Arenstam was very supportive and assured her she was ready for the challenge, regardless of her fears.

In 2005, she accepted the role and was named one of San Francisco Chronicle's "Rising Star Chefs" of 2006 along with Corey Lee of French Laundry and Mike Yakura of Le Colonial. Mah told Nation's Restaurant News that she studied and researched different recipes before she felt comfortable developing her own vision for Ponzu which incorporated some Korean cuisine. The Today Show described her approach to Asian cuisine as what she calls "Asia without a map." In 2008, she left Ponzu to join Joie de Vivre's new restaurant Midi in San Francisco's theatre district as executive chef. The San Francisco Chronicle wrote that Mah's recipes at the restaurant, this time based on European cuisine, "creates a fantasy voyage." She left Midi in 2010 to "take the opportunity to remember why I love cooking in the first place" and said she was interested in working at an independent restaurant or starting one of her own.

Mah worked as a consulting chef at the Brixton in 2010 and in 2011 joined Charles Phan's Slanted Door Group to head up Wo Hing's General Store, a Southern Chinese street food-inspired restaurant. 
 She transferred to Phan's The Slanted Door in 2012 and headed the kitchen as the chef de cuisine. In 2016, she transitioned into the role of Director of Operations.

In 2016, she was part of an event in coordination with the Asian Art Museum when the "meat shaped stone" was on display. Chefs, including Mah, created unique pork-belly recipes inspired by the rock at their restaurants. She also reviews and recommends on dining app Chefsfeed.

Awards 
 "Rising Star Chef" (2006) by the San Francisco Chronicle

References 

American chefs
Living people
Cuisine of the San Francisco Bay Area
1975 births
People from the San Francisco Bay Area
California Culinary Academy alumni
University of California, San Diego alumni
Women chefs
South Korean chefs
People from Seoul
People from San Dimas, California
Chefs from San Francisco